Renat Rakhmetzhanovich Baratov (born 30 April 1991) is a Russian former football forward.

Career
Baratov made his professional debut for FC Kuban Krasnodar on 15 July 2009 in the Russian Cup game against FC Sibir Novosibirsk.

External links
 
 
 

1991 births
People from Novopokrovsky District
Living people
Russian footballers
Association football forwards
FC Kuban Krasnodar players
FC Armavir players
Sportspeople from Krasnodar Krai